Alexandra Fouace (born 7 July 1979) is a French athlete who competed in archery at the 2000 and 2004 Summer Olympics.

In 2004, she was 30th in the women's individual ranking round with a 72-arrow score of 627. In the first round of elimination, she faced 35th-ranked Sayami Matsushita of Japan. Fouace lost 165–157 in the 18-arrow match, placing 34th overall in women's individual archery. She was also a member of the 4th-place French team in the women's team archery competition.

References

1979 births
Living people
French female archers
Archers at the 2000 Summer Olympics
Archers at the 2004 Summer Olympics
Olympic archers of France